This is a list of compositions by Kurt Atterberg.

List of works by main categories

Orchestral

Symphonies 
 Op.  3 Symphony No. 1 in B minor (1909–1911)
 Op.  6 Symphony No. 2 in F major (1911–1913)
 Op. 10 Symphony No. 3 in D major "Västkustbilder" (1914–1916)
 Op. 14 Symphony No. 4 in G minor "Sinfonia piccola" (byggd på svenska folkmotiv) (1918)
 Op. 20 Symphony No. 5 in D minor "Sinfonia funèbre" (1919–1922)
 Op. 31 Symphony No. 6 in C major "Dollar Symphony" (1927–1928)
 Op. 45 Symphony No. 7 "Sinfonia romantica" (1942)
 Op. 48 Symphony No. 8 "På Svenska Folkmotiv" (1944)
 Op. 54 Symphony No. 9 "Sinfonia visionaria" for soloists (mezzo-soprano & baritone), chorus, and orchestra (1955–1956)

Orchestral Suites 
 Suite No. 1 "Orientale" (1913)
 Suite No. 2 "Fem stycken" for chamber orchestra (1915)
 Op. 19,1 Suite No. 3 for violin, viola and string orchestra (1917)
 Op. 19,2 Suite No. 4 "Turandot" or '"Chinese suite" for string quartet (1920)
 Op. 23 Suite No. 5 "Barocco" pour flûte, haubois, clarinette et cordes (1923)
 Op. 30 Suite No. 6 "Orientalische Legende" for flute, oboe, clarinet, percussion, piano and string orchestra (1925)
 Op. 29 Suite No. 7 for string orchestra after music for a scene of Antoine et Cléopatre of Shakespeare (1926)
 Op. 34 Suite No. 8 "Suite pastorale in modo antico" for small orchestra (1931)
 Op. 47 Suite No. 9 "Suite dramatica" for chamber orchestra (1944)

Concertos 
 Op. 1 Rhapsody for Piano and Orchestra (1909)
 Op. 7 Concerto for Violin in E minor (1913)
 Op. 21 Concerto for Cello in C minor (1922)
 Op. 28 Concerto for Horn in A minor (1926)
 Op. 37 Concerto for Piano in B-flat minor (1935)
 Op. 57 Double concerto for violin, cello, and string orchestra (1959–1960)

Works for brass 
 De fåvitska jungfrurna rhapsody arranged by Gösta Morberg
 Marica trionfale della bella Lucia

Other orchestral works 
 Op.  4 Concert Overture in A minor (1910/12 rev. 1933)
 Op. 18 Svit ur Stormen ("Storm suite") No. 1 (1921/1936)
 Op. 26 Rondeau retrospectif (1925)
 Op. 33 Älven - från fjällen till havet (The River - from the Mountains to the Sea) symphonic poem (1929)
 Op. 36 En värmlandsrapsodi (A Varmland Rhapsody) (published 1935)
 Op. 38 Ballade and Passacaglia over a theme from a Swedish folk tune (1935)
 Op. 40 Kungahyllning for Concert Band (1938)
 Op. 41 Concert overture in popular style (1940)
 Op. 42 Rondeau caracteristique (1939–1940)
 Op. 43 Aladdin - five pieces (1941)
 Op. 44 Aladdin. Ouverture (Perpetuum mobile orientale)
 Op. 51 Indian tunes (1950)
 Op. 52 Daldansen (1951-1952)
 Op. 55 Rondo-overture on melodies from Birger Sjoberg's "Fridas Bok" (1956-7)
 Svensk sommarfest (Swedish summer party) for chamber orchestra (1957)
 Op. 56 Ballad without words (1958)
 Op. 58 Vittorioso (1962) (original finale to Symphony No. 7)
 Op. 59 Svit ur Stormen "Storm suite" No. 2 (1964–1965)

Stage music

Operas 
 Op. 12 Härvard Harpolekare (1916–18)
 Op. 50 Härvards Heimkehr - Revision of Op. 12 (1951)
 Op. 24 Bäckahästen (1923–24)
 Op. 35 Fanal (1929–32)
 Op. 43 Aladdin (1936–41)
 Op. 49 Stormen "The Storm" (1946–47)

Ballets 
 Op. 9 Per Svinaherde (1914–15)
 Ballettskizzen (1919)
 Op. 17 De fåvitska jungfrurna (1920)

Music for the theatre 
 Jefta (1913)
 Mats und Petter (1915)
 Schwester Beatrice (1917)
 Op. 13 Perseus och vidundret "Persus and the wonder" (1918)
 Turandot (1920)
 Op. 18 Der Sturm "The Storm" (1921)
 Op. 22 De tre mostrarna (1923)
 Ein Wintermärchen (1923)
 Hassan (1925)
 Antonius und Kleopatra (1926)

Vocal 
 Op. 5 Det är sabbatsdag i bygden for baritone and orchestra (text of Olof Thunman) (1911/13)
 Svarta svanor song for baritone or soprano and orchestra (text of Carl Johan Gustaf Snoilsky) (1913/14)
 Ave maris stella for chorus (1917)
 Op. 8 Requiem for soloists, chorus and orchestra (text of van Gustav Schlyter) (1914)
 Op. 16 Järnbäraland for soloists, chorus and orchestra (text of van Hugo Tigerschiöld) (1919)
 Op. 25 Das Lied for soloists (chœur ad lib.) and orchestra (1925)
 Op. 32 Sångens land "The Land of Song" for soloists (chœur ad lib.) and orchestra (text of Ture Rangström) (1928)

Chamber music

String quartets 
 Op. 2 String Quartet No. 1 in D major (1909) ("Adagio and Scherzo")
 Op. 11 String Quartet No. 2 (1918)
 Op. 39 String Quartet No. 3 in D major (1937)

Other chamber 
 Reverence à Bach for two cellos (1905)
 Op. 19,2 Suite No. 4 "Suite chinoise" for string quartet (1920)
 Op. 22 bis Bergslags-serenad for string quartet or string orchestra (published ca. 1950)
 Op. 27 Sonata for cello (or violin/viola/horn) and piano in B minor (1925, horn version 1955)
 Op. 31a Piano Quintet in C major (adaption from Symphony No. 6; 1928/1942)
 Op. 46 Variations and fugues - over a text of Bellman for string quartet (1944)
 Sorgmarch (Funeral march) in memoriam His Majesty Gustav V for horn quartet (1950)
 Op. 53a Symphony for strings - version for string quintet of Sinfonia Op. 53 (1953)
 Op. 57a Trio concerto for violin, cello and harp - chamber version (1959/60, rev. 1965)

Instrumental

Piano 
 Syster Beatrice - Valse "Fantôme" of Maeterlinck (1917)
 Op. 15 2 Höstballader "Autumn Ballads" (1918)
 Op. 26 Rondeau rétrospectif for piano four hands

Organ 
 Bröllopsmarsch "Wedding March" for organ (1916)
 Preludium and fugue for organ (1917)

Arrangements 
 Op. 36 Brahms, String Sextet No. 2 for string orchestra (1939)

References

Atterberg, Kurt, List of compositions by